Doom Abuse is the sixth full-length studio album from Nebraska act The Faint. The album was released in US on April 8, 2014.

Critical reception

Track listing

Personnel 

 Todd Fink 
 Jacob Thiele 
 Dapose (Michael Dappen) 
 Clark Baechle

Notes

External links
The Faint website
The Faint official MySpace

2014 albums
The Faint albums